LWMA may refer to
 London Working Men's Association
 Left-wing market anarchism